Olearia ferresii is a species of flowering plant in the family Asteraceae and is endemic to central Australia. It is an erect, aromatic shrub with elliptic to lance-shaped leaves and white and yellow, daisy-like inflorescences.

Description
The leaves are covered with glandular hairs and the edges of the leaves sometimes have small teeth. The heads or daisy-like "flowers" have white, rarely pale pink or pale purple ray florets surrounding yellow disc florets.

Taxonomy
This daisy bush was first formally described in 1862 by Ferdinand von Mueller who gave it the name Eurybia ferresii in Fragmenta Phytographiae Australiae from specimens collected by John McDouall Stuart in the MacDonnell Ranges. In 1867, George Bentham changed the name to Olearia ferresii in Flora Australiensis. The specific epithet (ferresii) honours John Ferres, the Victorian Government Printer at the time.

Distribution and habitat
Olearia ferresii grows on floodplains, on ranges and hills or in creek beds in the south of the Northern Territory, in western Queensland and in the Central Ranges biogeogrphic region of Western Australia.

References

Taxa named by Ferdinand von Mueller
Plants described in 1862
Flora of Western Australia
Flora of South Australia
ferresii